Battlefield Advanced Trauma Life Support (BATLS) is a military derivation of Advanced Trauma Life Support (ATLS). Instead of the traditional ABCDE mnemonic for Airway, Breathing, Circulation, Disability, and Exposure for ATLS, the treatment procedure for BATLS is cABCDE, with the initial "c" representing "catastrophic hemorrhage" (massive external bleeding).

References

External links

Emergency medical services
Traumatology
Emergency life support